Dahms is a surname. Notable people with the surname include:

 Gary Dahms (born 1947), American politician from Minnesota
 Harry Dahms, American professor
 Matthias Dahms (born 1961), German vibraphone and marimba soloist, percussionist, and composer
 Tom Dahms (1927–1988), American football player and coach

See also
 Nicole, Erica and Jaclyn Dahm
 Dahm (disambiguation)